= Lyn Slater =

Lyn Slater is an American fashion influencer. She publishes Accidental Icon, a fashion and style blog.

In 2024, she published the book How to Be Old: Lessons in Living Boldly from the Accidental Icon.

Lyn has a Ph.D. in Social Welfare.
